Bhaurao Karhade is an Indian film director, actor,  producer,  scriptwriter, filmmaker and he works in the Marathi Cinema, best known for his 2015 Marathi film Khwada for which he received National Film Award Special Jury Award and state award for Best Rural Director.

In 2018 Bhaurao returned with the action-drama, Baban was hit at the box office. The film collected around ₹15 crore in its 50-day run.

Early life and background 
Bhaurao karhade grew up in Ahmednagar district of Maharashtra. Karhade sold 5 acres of farm land to make the film Khwada.

Filmography

Awards and recognition

References 

Indian film directors
Indian actors
Living people
Year of birth missing (living people)